Infinity Eighteen Vol.1 is the second studio album of Japanese recording artist Ami Suzuki, released on February 9, 2000 through True Kiss Disc.

Information
The album was released the same day of Suzuki's eighteenth birthday. The album was a commercial success in Japan, debuted at number one its first week on the Oricon charts, and selling over one million copies, her second best-selling album to date. The album charted for 14 weeks on the Japanese Oricon charts.

After a legal dispute between Suzuki and her manager in September 2000, Sony put the album out of print along with all other Ami Suzuki singles and albums released up to that point, and she was blacklisted from the J-pop music scene. However, after she re-debuted under Avex Trax in 2005, the album was re-released later that same year as part of her Bazooka 17 box set. It was later re-released in a remastered version on the Blu-spec CD 2 format on September 11, 2013 simultaneously with her debut album SA.

Track listing

Singles

Ami Suzuki albums
2000 albums
Albums produced by Tetsuya Komuro